Harindra J Dave (19 September 1930 – 29 March 1995) was a Gujarati  poet, journalist, playwright and novelist of the post-independence Gujarati literature.

Life
He was born on 19 September 1930 in Khambhra village in Kachchh District, Gujarat, India (then Cutch State). He was educated at the Samaldas College,  Bhavnagar and later University of Bombay.

Career
He authored more than fifty works, including poems, essays, drama and fiction.

Aganpankhi (1962), Madhav Kyayn Nathi (1970), Krishna ane Manav Sambandho (1982), Mukhvato, Anagat, Hayati (1978), Sang-Asang, Lohi no Rang Lal (1981), Gandhi Ni Kavad (1984) are some of his works. His work Krishna ane Manav Sambandho  (1982) is a monumental research work on Krishna theme. His novel Madhav Kyany Nathi was translated into Hindi by Bhanushankar Mehta as Madhav Kahin Nahin Hain in 1995.

Journalism

He was a journalist by profession

He worked as a journalist with Janashakti, a Gujarati daily from 1951 to 1962. He joined Bhavan's as an editor of Samarpan, Gujarati monthly digest. In 1968, he joined USIS and continued till 1973.

In 1973, he joined Janashakti as an editor. His writing during the Emergency was notable. After Janashakti, he joined Janmabhoomi Group of Newspapers as an Editor in Chief for 'Janmabhoomi', an evening daily and 'Pravasi', a morning daily and 'Janambhoomi-Pravasi, a weekly.

Before embarking on daily journalism in 1951, Harindrabhai worked with Chitrapat, a film magazine. And during those years with Chitrapat, he came into association with personalities like Shyam, Suraiya, Guru Dutt, Mehbub Khan, Motilal, Mohammad Rafi, Ramanand Sagar etc.

Recognition
He received the Sahitya Akademi Award in 1978 for his poetry collection Hayati. He also received the Ranjitram Suvarna Chandrak in 1982, the Kabir Award (from the Madhya Pradesh Government), the Gujarati Sahitya Parishad award and the Goenka award for Journalism.

Personal life 
He married Jayalakshmi (25 May 1932 – 14 July 1987) in 1947. He had three sons from his first marriage: Rohit (born 1952), Prakash (born 1955) and Deepak (born 1960).

See also
 List of Gujarati-language writers

References

People from Kutch district
1930 births
1995 deaths
Gujarati-language writers
Gujarati people
Recipients of the Sahitya Akademi Award in Gujarati
20th-century Indian journalists
Journalists from Gujarat
Recipients of the Ranjitram Suvarna Chandrak
University of Mumbai alumni
Indian novelists
Indian poets
Indian dramatists and playwrights